Alexis Alexoudis (born 20 June 1972) is a Greek former footballer.
Alexoudis played most of his career for OFI Crete and Panathinaikos FC.

He played for Greece national team (4 matches/one goal), and was a participant at the 1994 FIFA World Cup.

From 22 November 1995 to 1 October 1997 he was at the top of the list for the fastest goals in UEFA Champions League history, thanks to a goal he scored after just 28.46 seconds into Panathinaikos' home match against Aalborg BK.

References

External links 
 Weltfussball 

1972 births
Living people
Footballers from Florina
Greek footballers
Greece international footballers
Panathinaikos F.C. players
OFI Crete F.C. players
Ethnikos Asteras F.C. players
Super League Greece players
1994 FIFA World Cup players
Association football forwards
Panelefsiniakos F.C. players